Plocamopherus tilesii is a species of sea slug, a nudibranch, a shell-less marine gastropod mollusk in the family Polyceridae.

Distribution 
This species occurs in the Pacific Ocean, from Japan south to Australia.

References

Polyceridae
Gastropods described in 1877